Mic Tyson is the third solo studio album by American rapper Sean Price. It was released on October 30, 2012, through Duck Down Records. Production was handled by Alchemist, Beat Butcha, Eric G, Evidence, 9th Wonder, AMP, Khrysis and Wool. It features guest appearances from Buckshot, Ill Bill, Pharoahe Monch, Pumpkinhead, Realm Reality, Ruste Juxx, Torae, Ike Eyes and Freddie Gibbs.

The album sold 7,000 copies in its first week and debuted at number 58 on the Billboard 200.

"STFU, Part 2" was released as a promotional single with animated music video directed by the Chain Gang.

It was the last album to be released in Price's lifetime before his death on August 8, 2015.

Background
Sean Price announced the album to the public in mid-2009 by releasing a mixtape  titled Kimbo Price: A Prelude to Mic Tyson, which contains 23 tracks. In an interview with VladTV he stated that "he's tryin' to fuck everybody on this album". He calls it Mic Tyson "because he's from Brownsville and that he knows how to fight".

In an interview with Grand Angel TV, he stated that the only confirmed guest thus far was rapper Chali 2na. However he did not make the final cut of the album. In that same year, he spoke with Conspiracy Radio regarding the producers slated on the album, which are Stu Bangas, The Alchemist, Evidence, Sid Roams (who as well did not make the final cut), 9th Wonder, (who has appeared on Price's two previous studio albums), Beat Butcha, etc.

In 2012 three videos on YouTube Dallas Penn channel surfaced of Price previewing tracks off of Mic Tyson, and after many of the pushbacks, Price stated that the album would see release in July. However it was pushed back, yet again, to October 30, which ended up being the actual release date.

Critical reception

Mic Tyson was met with generally favorable reviews. At Metacritic, which assigns a normalized rating out of 100 to reviews from mainstream publications, the album received an average score of 80, based on seven reviews.

Mark Bozzer of Exclaim! stated "Young rappers take notice: you want to sound like this when you get older". Steve 'Flash' Juon of RapReviews praised the album saying "Sean Price has rarely if ever lost a step and Mic Tyson is not going to be the time that he did". AllMusic's David Jeffries said "Price's material-starved fans are craving his words more than beats, so don't call it a comeback but a wicked, wordy return". HipHopDX reviewer RomanCooper said "It's a matter of execution, and in that regard, fans will have little to complain about". Writing for XXL, David "Rek" Lee said that "these verses could've fit on any of his past records or mixtapes. But the production on Mic Tyson ties them together nicely".

Track listing

Personnel
Sean Price – executive producer
Kenyatte "Buckshot" Blake – associate executive producer
Drew "Dru-Ha" Friedman – associate executive producer
"Dan The Man" Humiston – mixing
Michael Sarsfield – mastering
Raphael Tanghal – cover art
Jacqueline Shao – artwork
Skrilla – artwork
Haroon Gilani – back cover art

Charts

References

External links

2012 albums
Sean Price albums
Duck Down Music albums
Albums produced by Khrysis
Albums produced by 9th Wonder
Albums produced by Beat Butcha
Albums produced by Quelle Chris
Albums produced by Statik Selektah
Albums produced by Evidence (musician)
Albums produced by the Alchemist (musician)